Dazhao Temple may refer to:

 Jokhang, Lhasa
 Dazhao Temple (Hohhot)

Buddhist temple disambiguation pages